Binsey is a hill on the northern edge of the Lake District in Cumbria, England. It is detached from the rest of the Lakeland hills, and thus provides a good spot to look out at the Northern and North Western Fells of the Lake District, as well as the coastal plain and, across the Solway Firth, Scotland.  Snaefell on the Isle of Man is also visible on a clear day. It is the northernmost of the Wainwrights.

Topography
Binsey stands on the otherwise low-level watershed separating the catchments of the Ellen to the north and the Derwent to the south. A slight ridge connects it to Great Cockup in the main massif of the Northern Fells, two miles to the south east. Binsey itself has a rounded form, but somehow manages to impress the eye more than the similar Great Mell Fell and Little Mell Fell.

The ‘pudding basin’ shape holds all around Binsey except to the north west where a ridge descends over Whitas Park to a depression containing the remains of a Roman fort. Beyond is St John's Hill (950 ft / 290 m) (called Caermote Hill in Wainwright’s Outlying Fells) which is topped by an earthwork called ‘The Battery’. Finally the ridge descends to the village of Bothel in the Ellen Valley.

Binsey sends out a further spur to the east, culminating in the shapely top of Latrigg (1,030 ft)— not to be confused with Latrigg near Keswick. Beneath Latrigg is Over Water, a large tarn which was raised by damming in 1920 to provide drinking water for Wigton. The outflow of Over Water feeds the Ellen, as does the gloriously named Humble Jumble Gill which drains Binsey's northern flank.

The hill is largely grass and heather, with only one significant outcrop of rock, West Crag. Flanking the eastern slopes of the fell is a thin belt of mixed woodland and a further plantation sits below West Crag.

Summit
The summit is crowned by a tumulus whose stones have been raided to produce several small circular wind-shelters. There is also a modern cairn atop the tumulus and a trig point.
Regarding the view, Wainwright stated: ‘...it is a most excellent station for appraising the Northern Fells as a preliminary to their exploration...it is a viewpoint of outstanding merit.’ Far to the south the Coniston Fells can be seen, almost 25 miles (40 km) away, while to the north the Solway Firth and the hills of Scotland are visible.

A computer-generated summit panorama can be seen here. The furthest point visible on a clear day is the top of Slieve Donard, the highest mountain in Northern Ireland, in Mourne, 115 miles (185 km) away.

Geology
The hill is formed from volcanic rocks, namely various sub-units of the Eycott Volcanic Group, which consists of basaltic andesite, andesite and rhyolitic lavas. There are several small disused quarries to the east and north.

Ascents
The hill can be climbed by several routes, perhaps most simply beginning in the south-east (Parking on the road between Binsey Lodge and Fell Side Farm), following a track to the summit. An alternative is along a lane from the A591 road, just north of Bewaldeth. From the top of the lane a loop to the left and behind a disused pit will enable the track across the summit to be picked up. Wainwright also lists a further route from High Ireby.

Views from the summit

References

Marilyns of England
Fells of the Lake District
Tumuli in England
Allerdale